New Audio Machine is an album by the glam metal band Trixter. It was released in April 2012 on Frontiers Records. The album features the original lineup of the band. "Tattoos & Misery" was released as the first single and video in March 2012.

Track listing
"Drag Me Down" – 3:59 (Steve Brown, Glen Burtnik)
"Get On It" – 3:36 (Brown)
"Dirty Love" – 3:41 (Brown, Pete Loran, Jim DeSalvo)
"Machine" – 3:34 (Brown, PJ Farley, Mark Scott)
"Live for the Day" - 3:35 (Brown, Farley)
"Ride" – 3:48 (Brown, Farley)
"Physical Attraction" – 3:52 (Brown, Loran, DeSalvo)
"Tattoos & Misery" – 3:33 (Brown, Farley, Scott, Xandy Barry)
"The Coolest Thing" – 3:37 (Brown, Bobby August)
"Save Your Soul" – 4:03 (Brown)
"Walk With a Stranger (unused Skid Row  song)" – 4:32 (Rachel Bolan, Dave "The Snake" Sabo)
"Find a Memory (European Bonus)" - 3:25
"Heart of Steel (US Bonus [acoustic])" (Brown, Bill Wray)

Credits

Band members
Peter "Pete" Loran – lead vocals
Steve Brown – lead guitar
P. J. Farley – bass guitar
Mark "Gus" Scott – drums, percussion, backing vocals

Special Guests
Glen Burtnik - Additional Guitars, Bass, Vocals & Percussion (Track 1)
Eric Ragno - Keyboards (Tracks 1, 5 & 9)
Mark Sly - Backing Vocals (Track 9)
Pete Evick - Additional Guitars, Percussion (Track 9)
Bobby August - Backing Vocals (Track 9)
Angela Marien - Backing Vocals (Track 10)
John "J3" Allen - Backing Vocals (Track 11)

Production
Steve Brown
Chuck Alzakian

References

Trixter albums
2012 albums
Frontiers Records albums

it:Trixter (album)